State Route 302 (SR 302) is a  north–south state highway in Rhea County, Tennessee.

Route description

SR 302 begins in Old Washington at an intersection with SR 30. It winds its way north through farmland as Old Dixie Highway and Old Stage Road. It then has a short concurrency with SR 68 before following along the banks of Watts Bar Lake (as New Lake Road) to enter Spring City, where SR 302 comes to an end at an intersection with US 27/SR 29. The entire route of SR 302 is a two-lane highway.

Major intersections

References

302
Transportation in Rhea County, Tennessee